Marietta Gillman is a former American slalom canoeist who competed in the mid-to-late 1970s. She won two gold medals in the mixed C-2 event at the ICF Canoe Slalom World Championships, earning them in 1975 and 1977.

References

American female canoeists
Living people
Year of birth missing (living people)
Medalists at the ICF Canoe Slalom World Championships
21st-century American women